Herbert Wetterauer (born 21 April 1957 in Karlsruhe, West Germany) is a German painter, sculptor and author. He is known for his paintings in ink and life-sized figures made of paperboard, for which he developed his own technique.

Wetterauer studied German Language at the University of Karlsruhe and Fine Arts at the State Academy of Fine Arts Karlsruhe. For many years he was busy as a journalist, writing primary art critics.

In 2009 his first novel named Stromness appeared, followed by the novels Du sollst nicht vertrauen and tod.com.

Exhibitions (selection)
 2011: Presentation by the United Artists of Karlsruhe
 2008: One-Man-Show at the official art-shop-window (Kunstschaufenster ) of the City of Karlsruhe
 2001: Künstlerhaus-Gallery Karlsruhe
 1995: Art-Collection Westermann, City-Gallery of Rastatt
 1993: First Biennale for Material- and Textile-Art, Bayreuth and Manchester
 1990: First prize in the poster-competition, 4th Karlsruher Art-Mass
 1983: One-Man-Show at the State Art Museum Baden-Baden
 1983: One-Man-Show at Gallery Forum Rotart Karlsruhe

Own publications

 Consumption-Christmas, pferscha Nr. 3, Graz 1974
 The Mechanic of Cartoon-Drawings, Journal of Art Nr. 5, 1975
 Katchina, Ketchup-Magazine Nr. 2, 1981
 KiK-Magazine Nr. 9 – 70, 1980–1983
 The March of the Art-History, Artist Nr. 38, 1999
 Stromness, Schardt Verlag, Oldenburg, 2009, 
 The White Dog (Short story) in Neues Karlsruher Lesebuch, Info Verlag, Karlsruhe, 2010, 
 Du sollst nicht vertrauen, E-Book, 2013; KDP-Paperback, 2019, 
 DANEBEN – Geschichten aus der Nachbarschaft. E-Book 2013; KDP-Paperback 2019, 
 tod.com, Info Verlag, Karlsruhe 2013, 
 Haltung der griechischen Landschildkröte. E-Book und KDP-Paperback, 2019, 
 Das Werk – Eine Monographie in Selbstzeugnissen. E-Book und KDP-Paperback, 2020, 
 Wurst – ein Leitfaden. Erzählungen. E-Book und KDP-Paperback, 2020, 
 Kein Tag ohne Linie – Ein Memes-Bilderbuch. KDP-Paperback, 2021,

Reporting
 Badisches Tagblatt, 22 September 1983
 Kunstforum international, Bd. 69, 1984 
 Badische Neueste Nachrichten, 30 March 1989; 26 June 2010
 Der Kurier, 5 April 1991, 29 April 2010; 25 June 2010
 Nürnberger Nachrichten, 21 May 1993
 Het Nieuwsblad (NL), 9 October 1994
 Eindhovens Dagblad (NL), 16 October 1994
 Pfalz-Echo, 21 December 2009, 25 November 2013
 RaumK, Nr. 89, March 2010
 Die Rheinpfalz, 6. Januar 2010, 19. Januar 2021
 Klappe auf, Issue May 2010

References

External links

 Herbert Wetterauer on German Wikipedia
 Website of Herbert Wetterauer
 Official Culture-Server of the Federal Republic of Germany
 Website of the United Artists Karlsruhe
 International Index of Artists
 Interview with Herbert Wetterauer (German language)

1957 births
Artists from Karlsruhe
Living people
20th-century German painters
German male painters
21st-century German painters
21st-century German novelists
20th-century German sculptors
20th-century German male artists
German male sculptors
21st-century German sculptors
21st-century German male artists
German male novelists
21st-century German male writers